Lidcombe Shopping Centre is a shopping centre in the suburb of Lidcombe in Greater Western Sydney.

Transport 
The Metrobus M92 bus from Sutherland to Parramatta passes through Lidcombe Centre. The bus stop is located on John Street and is a five minute bus ride from Lidcombe Station to the centre.

Lidcombe Shopping Centre has a multi level car park with 1,085 spaces.

History 
Auburn Power Centre opened in 2006 on the site of the old Ford Fury car yard, office & warehouse building which was demolished in 2005. It was a bulky goods centre that featured Anaconda, Spotlight, Dick Smith Powerhouse, Party Warehouse, a Ten Pin Bowling Alley and around 30 stores. Auburn Power Centre was renamed Lidcombe Power Centre in 2009. American retailer Costco opened its second Australian store across the road from Lidcombe Power Centre in late July 2011. Dick Smith closed its store in 2012. 

Despite population growth in the area, Lidcombe Power Centre was facing a decline because it lacked a supermarket and discount department store. On 10 November 2014, Lidcombe Power Centre went through a $120m redevelopment that transformed the centre from a bulky goods centre to a sub-regional shopping centre. The centre was to be called The Marketplace Auburn. Leading retailers including Woolworths, Aldi and Kmart were added to the centre. Anaconda and Spotlight have continued trading during the redevelopment and moved to the new part of the centre when the redevelopment was completed. Discount Party Warehouse and Tenpin City have remain at their original locations. 

This centre was developed by Newmark Capital Ltd and the APN Property Group Ltd. Up to 1000 new jobs were created as a result of the redevelopment.

The centre is now known as the Lidcombe Centre and opened late August 2015.

In October 2018, Vicinity Centres sold Lidcombe Shopping Centre to a private investor for $145 million.

Tenants 
Lidcombe Shopping Centre has 29,652m² of floor space. The major retailers include Kmart, Aldi, Woolworths, Anaconda, Daiso, Discount Party Warehouse, Spotlight and Tenpin City.

References

External links 
 Lidcombe Shopping Centre Official Website

Shopping centres in Sydney
Shopping malls established in 2006
2006 establishments in Australia